Amiya Kumar Bhuyan   is an Indian politician. He was elected to the Assam Legislative Assembly from Bihpuria (Vidhan Sabha constituency) in the 2021 Assam Legislative Assembly election as a member of the Bharatiya Janata Party.

Early life and education
Amiya Kumar Bhuyan was born in the Badulati village of Lakhimpur district, Assam. He completed his master's in Political Science from Guwahati University in 1992. Later, in 2002 he completed his Masters in Law from Guwahati University. He got his Ph.D. from Guwahati University in 2006.

References

Bharatiya Janata Party politicians from Assam
Living people
People from Lakhimpur district
Year of birth missing (living people)
21st-century Indian politicians
Assam MLAs 2021–2026